Denmark–India relations, also referred to as Danish-Indian relations, are the bilateral relations between Denmark and India. Denmark has an embassy in New Delhi, and India has an embassy in Copenhagen. About 15,595 NRIs reside in Denmark.

History
Tranquebar, a town in the southern Indian state of Tamil Nadu, was a Danish colony in India from 1620 to 1845. It is spelled Trankebar or Tranquebar in Danish, which comes from the native Tamil, Tarangambadi, meaning "place of the singing waves". It was sold, along with the other Danish settlements in mainland India, most notably Serampore (now in West Bengal), to Great Britain in 1845. The Nicobar Islands were also colonized by Denmark, until sold to the British in 1868.
After Independence in 1947, the Indian prime minister Pandit Jawaharlal Nehru's visit to Denmark in 1957 laid the foundation for a friendly relationship between India and Denmark that has endured ever since. The bilateral relations between India and Denmark are cordial and friendly, based on cooperation in political, economic, academic and research fields. There have been periodic high level visits between the two countries.

Visits
Anders Fogh Rasmussen, the former Prime Minister of Denmark, accompanied by a large business delegation, paid a State visit to India from February 4–8, 2008. He visited Infosys, Biocon and IIM Bangalore in Bangalore and Agra. He launched an ‘India Action Plan’, which called for strengthening of the political dialogue, strengthening of cooperation in trade and investments, research in science and technology, energy, climate and environment, culture, education, student exchanges and attracting skilled manpower and IT experts to Denmark for short periods. The two countries signed an Agreement for establishment of a Bilateral Joint Commission for Cooperation. Mette Frederiksen visited India for 3 days state visit in 2021. She had bilateral talks with Prime Minister Narendra Modi. She visited Taj Mahal.
Prime Minister of Denmark H.E. Ms. Mette Frederiksen paid a State Visit to India from 9–11 October 2021. This was the first visit by a Head of Government to India following the COVID-19 pandemic.
Bilateral talks between the two Prime Ministers were held in a warm and friendly atmosphere demonstrating the close partnership between the two countries. Both sides reviewed the progress in Green Strategic Partnership which was established during the Virtual Summit held in September 2020. During her visit to India, PM Frederiksen visited Agra and the Garvi Gujarat Bhavan where she got a glimpse of the rich cultural heritage of India. She gave a special address at an event organized by the Observer Research Foundation on the Green Strategic Partnership and on the importance of close collaboration to combat climate change.

Purulia case

In July 2012, the Govt of India decided to scale down its diplomatic ties with Denmark after their refusal to appeal in their Supreme Court against a decision of its lower court rejecting the extradition of Purulia arms drop case prime accused Kim Davy a.k.a. Niels Holck. Upset over Denmark's refusal to act on India's repeated requests to appeal in their apex court to facilitate Davy's extradition to India, the Indian government issued a circular directing all senior officials not to meet or entertain any Danish diplomat posted in India.

Investments

Denmark ranks 26th among foreign investors in India. Danish direct investment in India during 2008 and 2009 was US$ 57 million and US$75 million respectively.

Agreements

Important Bilateral Treaties and Agreements:
 Technical Cooperation Agreement – 1970
 Bilateral Agreement on an Integrated Fisheries Project at Tadri, Karnataka - 1981
 Bilateral Investment Promotion and Protection Agreement- 1995
 Protocol on Avoidance of Double Taxation - 1995
 MoU Cooperation between CII and Confederation of Danish Industries – 1995
 Protocol on Foreign Office Consultation - 1995
 Joint Business Council Agreement between FICCI and the Danish Industry - 2002
 MoU Biotechnology for Bilateral Cooperation – 2004
 MoU Clean Development Mechanism – 2008
 MoU Cooperation in the area of Environment – 2009
 MoU Labour Mobility Partnership – 2009
 Social Security Agreement – 2010

See also 

 India-Denmark relations

References

 
India 
Bilateral relations of India
Relations of colonizer and former colony